Commandant Fernand Bonneton was a French World War I flying ace credited with nine confirmed aerial victories. He would survive the war, only to die in an aviation accident on 24 June 1922.

Early life

Fernand Bonneton was born in La Coucourde-Montelimar on 10 May 1890.

World War I
In the beginning of World War I, Bonneton served in the cavalry until he was wounded twice. After a voluntary transfer to the infantry, he was wounded twice more and invalided out of ground service in May 1916. He then volunteered for transfer to aviation duty. After training at Juvisy, he was stationed on the Eastern Front; in Spring 1917, he was in Romania. He was credited with his first aerial victory there on 8 August; there may have been a second, but details are not available. At any rate, he earned two Mentions in Dispatches and five foreign decorations before moving south to Italy, where he scored again on 30 October 1917.

In May 1918, he was moved back to France to join Escadrille Spa69 (the 'Spa' denoting the squadron's use of Spads). On 10 July 1918, Bonneton shot down his third enemy airplane. He then began a career as a balloon buster, running off a string of five wins over them, along with another win over an enemy plane, by 22 October 1918.

Postwar

Bonneton commanded a squadron in Poland at war's end. Then he became Commandant of 1e Fighter Groupe. While serving in this capacity, he died in a flying accident at Brussels on 24 June 1922.

Endnotes

References
 Over the Front: A Complete Record of the Fighter Aces and Units of the United States and French Air Services, 1914-1918 (1992). Norman L. R. Franks, Frank W. Bailey. Grub Street. , .

External links
 The Aerodrome website at http://www.theaerodrome.com/aces/france/bonneton.php

1890 births
1922 deaths
Recipients of the Croix de Guerre 1914–1918 (France)
French military officers
Recipients of the Legion of Honour
French World War I flying aces